The Super V-2 was a planned intermediate-range ballistic missile designed in France in 1946–47. It was the creation of German engineers who had worked on the original V-2 rocket. However, the French government declined to fund practical development and the programme was cancelled in 1948. The research done on the Super V-2 was repurposed to develop the Véronique sounding rocket, ultimately leading to the Ariane rocket family.

Development 
Between May and September 1946, France's Centre for the Study of Self-Propelled Missiles (CEPA) recruited around thirty German engineers who had previously worked on the rocket programmes of Nazi Germany at the Peenemünde Army Research Center. Like its counterparts in the United Kingdom, United States and Soviet Union, CEPA aimed to obtain and further develop the rocket technology devised by Germany during the Second World War.

The engineers were settled in Vernon, halfway between Paris and Rouen. They devised a two-stage project, no. 4211, which envisaged assembling and flying V-2 missiles constructed with original parts. Around 75 percent of the parts needed to assemble thirty V-2 missiles were acquired from companies in France and the French occupation zone in Germany that had supplied the original German V-2 project. However, the French were unable to acquire the remaining 25 percent of the parts due to the refusal of the United States and Soviet Union to supply them. It was also found that it would take much longer than expected to build test facilities in France and French-ruled Algeria.

This forced a different approach. The work on project 4211 was redirected towards an existing parallel project, no. 4212, that had been started to create a "pure French" development of the Aggregat rocket family – of which the V-2 was a member – along the lines originally envisaged by the Peenemünde researchers during the war. A new and much more powerful engine would be developed for the V-2, powered by new fuels, to create an advanced long-range V-2-based rocket. The rocket would be the same size as the original V-2 but would be much stronger structurally and capable of generating up to 40 tons of thrust, with detachable booster rockets and aerodynamic surfaces to increase its range.

Variants 

Four versions of the Super V-2 were envisaged, each representing a progressive technological increase from its predecessor:

 R1 – a  warhead and  range. Propelled by nitric acid and kerosene, pressure-fed to the engine by a gas generator.
 R2 – a  warhead and  range, with a turbopump-fed engine fuelled by liquid oxygen and kerosene.
 R2S – a  warhead and  range, or a  warhead over a  range. Propelled by nitric acid and kerosene fuel with a turbopump-fed engine. This would be the first French strategic ballistic missile to go into production, bringing together all the technological advances of the first two variants.
 R2M – a  warhead with a  range, using a turbopump-fed engine fuelled by nitric acid and kerosene. This would essentially be a French version of the A9/A10 "Amerika Rakete" envisaged by von Braun, capable of striking targets as far away as Russia; its greatly increased range relied on using a detachable booster rocket and aerodynamic lift surfaces that would enable the rocket to reach a high altitude and then glide to its target.

Outcome 

Although much work was done on the theoretical design of the Super V-2 and its fuel handling systems, the French government expressed little interest in funding practical development. The project was cancelled in 1948 and the development work was refocused towards the much smaller Véronique rocket. This ultimately led to the development of the Diamant rockets in the 1960s and the Ariane rockets from the 1970s onwards.

References 

Intermediate-range ballistic missiles
Space program of France
Rockets and missiles